Schaar is a surname. Notable people with the surname include:

Fabian Schaar (born 1989), German cyclist
Gerhard Schaar (1919–1983), German U-boat commander
John Schaar (1928–2011), American academic and political theorist
Marijke Schaar (born 1944), Dutch tennis player
Tom Schaar (born 1999), American skateboarder

See also
Erzsébet Schaár (1905–1975), Hungarian sculptor
Stijn Schaars (born 1984), Dutch footballer

German-language surnames